Odostomia muelleri is a species of sea snail, a marine gastropod mollusc in the family Pyramidellidae, the pyrams and their allies.

Distribution
This species occurs in the Atlantic Ocean off Southern Brazil.

References

External links
 To Encyclopedia of Life
 To World Register of Marine Species

muelleri
Gastropods described in 1900